Chulluncunayoc (possibly from Quechua chhullunku, chhullunka, icicle / ice, -na, -yuq suffixes) is a mountain in the Andes of  Peru, about  high. It lies in the Cusco Region, Calca Province, Calca District, east of the Urubamba mountain range. Chulluncunayoc is situated northeast of Ccerayoc and Pachacútec and southwest of Yanacaca (possibly from Quechua for "black rock").

References 

Mountains of Peru
Mountains of Cusco Region